Harwich station was a railway station located in Harwich, Massachusetts. The station was built by the Cape Cod Railroad when the line was extended beyond Yarmouth. It was the junction point between the Cape Main Line and the Chatham Branch.

References

External links

Old Colony Railroad Stations on Cape Cod
Stations along Old Colony Railroad lines
Former railway stations in Massachusetts